Cleveland State Community College is a public community college in Cleveland, Tennessee. It is operated by the Tennessee Board of Regents. Like most community colleges, emphasis is on associate's degree-level classes, but it also offers some third- and fourth-year college-level courses as well, through arrangements with other institutions.

History 
The Tennessee Board of Education authorized the establishment of one of the first three community colleges in Tennessee on June 22, 1965. The name Cleveland State Community College was chosen by the board of education on February 11, 1966. Bids for the first five campus building were announced on July 20, 1966, and the school's campus broke ground on September 11, 1966. David F. Adkisson was named the first president on January 1, 1967. Approximately 700 students enrolled for the school's first classes which began on October 2, 1967, and took place at North Cleveland Baptist Church, due to a delay in the completion of the campus. At this time offices were held at 685 Broad Street N.W. in Downtown Cleveland. The move to the current campus and permanent facilities took place on January 3, 1968. At this time, the campus consisted of the Administration Building, Library, Science Building, Student Center, and Gymnasium. The official dedication ceremonies for the college took place on April 29, 1968. The first graduation ceremonies were conducted on June 1, 1969.

Campus 
The  sits on the eastern foot of Candies Creek Ridge in northern Cleveland near Interstate 75. The campus has 10 major buildings housing modern classrooms, laboratories, and student activity centers. Additional features include a library, a multi-media center of emphasis, computer laboratories, a 400-seat theatre, a 3,000-seat gymnasium, athletic fields and tennis courts, a large reflector telescope, and a satellite downlink receiver which enables the college to serve as a site for many teleconferences. Cleveland State offers classes throughout the service area in southeast Tennessee, which includes Bradley, Meigs, McMinn, Monroe, and Polk counties. The college also has offices and classrooms in Athens and Madisonville.

Organization and administration 
Cleveland State Community college operates within the governance of the Tennessee Board of Regents.

Dr. David F. Adkisson served as founding president of Cleveland State Community College from 1967 to 1978. Dr. L. Quentin Lane was appointed to the presidency in 1978 and served until 1985. A. Ray Coleman served briefly as interim president in 1985. Dr. James W. Ford was then appointed as president of Cleveland State from 1985 to 1992. Dr. Renate G. Basham served as interim president from 1992 to 1996.  Dr. Carl M. Hite served as president from 1996 until 2013.  The current president is Dr. Ty A. Stone, who was hired in 2022.

Academic profile 
Approximately 3,700 credit students and 1,300 non-credit students enroll in Cleveland State Community College in a typical fall semester. The credit student population is split about evenly in the choice of transfer or career-technical programs. The average age of all students is 28 years and the student population is non-racially identifiable. There are over 200 employees at the college including more than 70 full-time faculty members. Eighty-six percent of the faculty hold Master's or Doctor's degrees.

Student life

Sport 
The college athletic teams are sports_nicknamed the Cougars.

Noted people 

 Ryan Casteel - baseball player
 Jason Davis - baseball player
 Bubba Trammell - baseball player

References

External links
Official website

 
Buildings and structures in Bradley County, Tennessee
Cleveland, Tennessee
Education in Bradley County, Tennessee
Education in McMinn County, Tennessee
Educational institutions established in 1967
1967 establishments in Tennessee
Community colleges in Tennessee
Universities and colleges accredited by the Southern Association of Colleges and Schools
NJCAA athletics